The 2018–19 Omaha Mavericks men's basketball team represents the University of Nebraska Omaha during the 2018–19 NCAA Division I men's basketball season. The Mavericks, led by 14th-year head coach Derrin Hansen, play their home games at Baxter Arena as members of The Summit League.

Previous season
The Mavericks finished the season 9–22, 4–10 in Summit League play to finish in seventh place. They lost in the quarterfinals of the Summit League tournament to South Dakota State.

Roster

Schedule and results

|-
!colspan=9 style=|Regular season

|-
!colspan=9 style=| Summit League regular season

|-
!colspan=9 style=| Summit League tournament

References

2018-19
2018–19 Summit League men's basketball season
2018 in sports in Nebraska
2019 in sports in Nebraska